This is a list of the National Register of Historic Places listings in Menard County, Texas.

This is intended to be a complete list of properties and districts listed on the National Register of Historic Places in Menard County, Texas. There are one district and two individual properties listed on the National Register in the county. The district is a Texas State Historic Site and includes a Recorded Texas Historic Landmark. Both individual properties are State Antiquities Landmarks while one is also a Recorded Texas Historic Landmark.

Current listings

The locations of National Register properties and districts may be seen in a mapping service provided.

|}

See also

National Register of Historic Places listings in Texas
List of Texas State Historic Sites
Recorded Texas Historic Landmarks in Menard County

References

External links

Menard County, Texas
Menard County
Buildings and structures in Menard County, Texas